The 1982 Minnesota Golden Gophers football team represented the University of Minnesota in the 1982 Big Ten Conference football season. In their fourth year under head coach Joe Salem, the Golden Gophers compiled a 3–8 record and were outscored by their opponents by a combined total of 295 to 287. It was the first season in the H.H.H. Metrodome.
 
Quarterback Mike Hohensee received the team's Most Valuable Player award, while offensive lineman Randy Rasmussen was named offensive MVP, and defensive end Karl Mecklenburg was named the defensive MVP. Rasmussen, offensive lineman Bill Humphries, and Mecklenburg were named All-Big Ten second team.  Mecklenburg, defensive lineman Fred Orgas and fullback Bob Stroup were named Academic All-Big Ten.

Total attendance for the season was 413,200, which averaged to 59,028. The season high for attendance was against Iowa.

Schedule

Roster

Game summaries

Iowa

at Michigan

at Ohio State

at Wisconsin

References

Minnesota
Minnesota Golden Gophers football seasons
Minnesota Golden Gophers football